Olivier Cottagnoud (born 20 March 1961) is a former Swiss sport shooter who won medals at senior level at the European 300 m Rifle Championships (four individual and thirteen with the Swiss team).

References

External links
 

1961 births
Living people
Swiss male sport shooters
Place of birth missing (living people)